The Czech First League, known as the Fortuna liga for sponsorship reasons, is a Czech professional league for football clubs. At the top of the Czech football league system, it is the country's primary football competition. Seasons typically run from August to May, most games are played on Saturdays and Sundays with few games played on Fridays. All Fortuna liga clubs qualify for the Czech Cup.

The history of the Czech football league began with its reorganization for the 1993–94 season following the dissolution of Czechoslovakia and therefore the league became the successor of the Czechoslovak League. Thirty-five clubs have competed in the Fortuna liga since its founding. Sparta Prague has won the title 12 times, the most among Czech clubs. Other clubs that were crowned as champions are Slavia Prague, Slovan Liberec, Baník Ostrava and Viktoria Plzeň, who are the reigning champions.

Based on performances in European competitions over the past five years, the league is ranked 17th in the UEFA league rankings for the 2021–22 season.

Competition format
In the inaugural season, two points were awarded for a win, before switching to three points for a win in 1994. Teams are ranked by total points, in the case of two or more teams finishing with equal points, the head-to-head record between the teams is used for ranking, counting points in relevant games, then goal difference and then goals scored.

1993–2018
There were 16 clubs in the league. During the course of a season, which lasted from August to May, each club played the others twice, once at their home stadium and once at that of their opponents, for a total of 30 games.

New format
The 2018–19 season was the first season played with the new competition format. After the regular season, which lasts from July to April and involves each team playing every other team home and away, the teams are divided into three groups. The top six teams enter the championship group, with the first-placed team being named champions. The teams play against each other only once, playing total of five additional matches. Points earned are added to the points from the regular season.

The teams 7th–10th position after 30 games take part in the Europa League play-offs. The best of them play against the fourth-placed or fifth-placed (it depends on the result of the Czech Cup and on the Czech coefficient rankings between European football leagues) of the championship group to determine who will participate in the Europa League.

The teams from 11th–16th position play in the same format as the championship group. The team finishing in 16th position is relegated directly to the Czech National Football League, while teams in 15th and 14th places play relegation play-offs against teams finishing 2nd and 3rd in the Czech National Football League.

Changes in 2020/21
Due to positive tests for Covid-19 in the 2019–20 season the relegation group was abandoned.
The league announced that due to time pressure the relegation group will remain unfinished and as a consequence, no team can be relegated and the winner of the second league should be promoted. To avoid playing the 2020–21 season with odd number of teams, the automatic promotion was granted to the second placed team as well. There were 18 clubs in the league, each club plays the others twice, once at their home stadium and once at that of their opponents, for a total of 34 games. The three lowest placed teams were relegated to the second tier (Czech National Football League). From the 2021–22 season, the system returns to its previous format.

Champions

Year by year

Performance by club

Participating teams in 2022–23

Map

2022–23 season
The following 16 clubs are competing in the 2022–23 Czech First League.

Managers
.

Sponsorship
In 1997 the league started a sponsorship deal with Plzeňský Prazdroj, a. s. and became known as the Gambrinus liga (after the company's Gambrinus beer). In 2008, the sponsorship was extended until the end of the 2013–14 season.

In May 2014, the league announced a four-year sponsorship deal with betting firm Synot, becoming the Synot liga. However, in January 2016 the company announced that their deal would conclude at the end of the 2015–16 season.

In July 2016 a new two-year sponsorship deal was announced, with the league partnering ePojisteni.cz, an online insurance company. The league subsequently became known as the ePojisteni.cz liga. Due to a government subsidy scandal and the arrest of FAČR chairman , ePojisteni.cz terminated the contract prematurely in May 2017. The league was then renamed HET liga for the 2017–18 season, after paint manufacturer HET.

In October 2016 FAČR, League Football Association and Czech betting company Fortuna a.s. signed a 6-year partnership deal. In accordance with this deal, the Czech First League will be called Fortuna liga from the 2018–19 season.

Media coverage

All time table
.

The table counts all the seasons since the Czech First League was founded in 1993. Highlighted teams will be competing in the 2022–23 Czech First League. 

 Point deductions are not counted in this historical table (2004–05: 1. FC Slovácko −12, SFC Opava −6, Slovan Liberec −6; 2009–10: Bohemians Praha (Střížkov) −15; 2011–12: Sigma Olomouc −9).
 A win was awarded with 2 points in the 1993–94 season.

Statistics

UEFA coefficients

The following data indicates Czech coefficient rankings between European football leagues.

UEFA Country ranking
.
 13th  (14)  Swiss Super League (30.175)
 14th  (12)  Ukrainian Premier League (29.500)
 15th  (16)  Czech First League (29.050)
 16th  (17)  Eliteserien (29.000)
 17th  (18)  Danish Superliga (27.825)

UEFA Club ranking
.
 32th  Slavia Prague (52.000)
 74th  Viktoria Plzeň (22.000)
 112th  Sparta Prague (14.000)
 120th  Jablonec (12.000)

Attendance

Records
.
Following statistics count only seasons of Czech First League since its inception in 1993.

Clubs are in order of the first appearance.

Highlighted players currently plays in the Czech First League.

Most appearances

Most appearances (expatriate players)

Most appearances by country

Appearances by age

Most goals

Most goals (expatriate players)

Goal scorers by age

Fastest goals
Source:

Most clean sheets

Most yellow cards

Most red cards

Most games coached

References

External links

 Official website of Czech First League (English version)
 Official website of Czech football
 fotbal.iDNES.cz
 První fotbalová liga at eFotbal.cz
 League321.com – Czech Republic football league tables, records & statistics database 
 Czech Republic – List of Champions at RSSSF

 
Czech Republic
1
Professional sports leagues in the Czech Republic